Sung Eun-ryung (born 14 April 1992 in Seoul) is a South Korean luger.

Sung competed at the 2014 Winter Olympics for South Korea. In the Women's singles she placed 29th. She was also a part of the South Korean relay team, which finished 12th.

As of September 2014, Sung's best performance at the FIL World Luge Championships is 29th, in the 2013 Championships.

As of September 2014, Sung's best Luge World Cup overall finish is 35th in 2011–12.

Education
Yong In University

References

External links
 

1992 births
Living people
South Korean female lugers
Lugers at the 2014 Winter Olympics
Lugers at the 2018 Winter Olympics
Olympic lugers of South Korea
Sportspeople from Seoul
Yong In University alumni